Turkish Figure Skating Championships are held annually to determine the figure skating champions of Turkey. Medals may be awarded in the disciplines of men's singles, ladies' singles, ice dancing, and synchronized skating, although not every discipline is held every year due to a lack of participants. The event is organized by the Turkish Ice Skating Federation, the sport's national governing body.

Senior medalists

Men

Ladies

Ice dancing

Junior medalists

Men

Ladies

Advanced novice medalists

Men

Ladies

References

External links
 Turkish Ice Skating Federation

 
Figure skating national championships